The Queers are an American punk rock band, formed in 1981 by the Portsmouth, New Hampshire native Joseph “Joe” P. King (a.k.a. Joe Queer) along with Scott Gildersleeve (a.k.a. Tulu), and John “Jack” Hayes (a.k.a. Wimpy Rutherford). With the addition of Keith Hages (ex-guitarist of Berlin Brats) joining on bass in 1983 the band started playing their first public performances. This original lineup played a total of five or six live shows. The original lineup of The Queers initially broke up in late 1984, but reformed with Joe Queer and a new line-up in 1986. In 1990, the band signed with Shakin' Street Records and released their first album Grow Up. The album earned the band notability within New England, but with the release of their next album 1993's Love Songs for the Retarded, on Lookout! Records, their following grew larger.

In 2006, after releasing six albums on Lookout! Records, the band rescinded their master rights from the label, citing breach of contract over unpaid royalties. Later that year they signed with Asian Man Records.

The Queers' cover of "Wipe Out" was featured in the 2007 Columbia Pictures and ImageWorks Studios mockumentary film Surf's Up, produced by Sony Pictures Animation and National Geographic Films.

History
The Queers were formed in 1981 in Portsmouth, New Hampshire. The original lineup consisted of guitarist/vocalist Joe King, bassist Tulu, and drummer Wimpy Rutherford. King and Rutherford had played together in several short-lived punk bands, but King was inspired to start a new group after spending a summer in Manhattan Beach, California, and seeing Black Flag play. Tulu stated that their name had nothing to do with homosexuality, and meant queer as in someone strange or an outsider.

The original lineup only played four shows before Rutherford switched from drums to lead vocals Tulu from bass to drums, while Keith Hages joined on bass. This lineup broke up in 1984 when Tulu went back to school, and while never releasing a proper album at the time, the 1996 compilation A Day Late and a Dollar Short compiled various singles and other recordings from this era.
 
In 1986, King formed a new version of the band with DMZ guitarist J. J. Rassler, bassist Kevin Kecy, and drummer Hugh O'Neill. The band broke up again in 1987 after King bought a restaurant, but the next year were reformed by King and O'Neill, with Sean Rowley on rhythm guitar and new bassist B-Face. Sean Rowley left the band in 1990 to attend art school. In 1990, this lineup released the band's debut album Grow Up on a small English label called Shakin' Street Records. When Grow Up caught the attention of Screeching Weasel frontman Ben Weasel, he convinced Lookout! Records owner Larry Livermore to sign The Queers, who released their second album, Love Songs for the Retarded, on Lookout! in 1993. To promote the album the band went on tours with Screeching Weasel and Rancid.

By now the band had developed problems with drug and alcohol use. Larry Livermore, who was in the studio with the band for Love Songs for the Retarded, recalled that while Joe King was able to stop drinking, heroin remained an issue for both King and Hugh O'Neill. The other members staged an intervention for O'Neill, who was forced to take a leave of absence from the band to deal with his addiction.

Jay Adelberg filled in on drums, performing on the live album Shout at the Queers; their 1994 cover version of the Ramones' 1977 album Rocket to Russia (released as part of Selfless Records' Ramones covers album series); and "Blabbermouth", their contribution to the 1994 Ben Weasel-curated compilation album Punk USA.

The recording for the band's next album, 1994's Beat Off, was scheduled to take place partway through a U.S. tour, but O'Neill was once again sidelined by addiction. The Queers instead recruited Screeching Weasel drummer Dan Panic, and also added his bandmate Dan Vapid as a second guitarist. Panic and Vapid would record Beat Off with The Queers, though Vapid's guitar parts were removed from the album before its release. They also played on the subsequent live album, Suck This (1995), and Vapid would play on 1995's Surf Goddess EP. For the 1995 studio album Move Back Home, O'Neill returned, and the classic lineup of King, B-Face, and O'Neill would record one more album together with 1996's Don't Back Down, which also saw the return of JJ Rassler on guitar. The album also marked the last release with Lookout! Records. The band had been offered a three-album deal with Epitaph Records, which King was in favor of, but B-Face and O'Neill weren't. The rift over this caused King to replace them with bassist Dave Swain from Jon Cougar Concentration Camp, and The Dwarves drummer Chris Fields. After leaving The Queers, B-Face would play bass for Chixdiggit!, The Mopes, and The Groovie Ghoulies, while O'Neill developed brain cancer, dying on January 20, 1999.

Music
The Queers play a Ramones-derived style of pop punk. Much like The Ramones, common lyrical themes are of girls, love, drugs, alcohol and having fun. Musically the band deviates slightly from the driving rhythm guitar sound of the Ramones and augments their songs with harmony vocals and guitar solos. They have been described by Livermore as "The Ramones meets The Beach Boys". Ben Weasel of Screeching Weasel infrequently collaborates on songwriting with Joe Queer. The band is well known for the variety of cover versions they include on their records and during live performances. Bands/artists covered by The Queers include The Beach Boys, Ramones (including a complete re-recording of the Rocket to Russia album), Unnatural Axe, The Nobodys, Angry Samoans, The Mr. T Experience, Skeeter Davis, The Fantastic Baggys, The Who, The Undertones, The Hobos, Tommy James and The Shondells, Helen Love, The Catalogs (from Hawaii, featuring Les Hernandez of The Quintessentials), The Banana Splits and many more.

Controversy
Joe Queer has been publicly outspoken against Nazism and white supremacy over the years as expressed in various interviews and in the song "You're Tripping" off of the 1993 Lookout Records release Love Songs for the Retarded. The lyrics state "I hate white power... Can't you see, this ain't Nazi Germany".

In a 2014 open letter, Joe Steinhardt of Don Giovanni Records called on Asian Man Records and Recess Records to drop The Queers after Joe Queer made public statements in support of Ferguson police officer Darren Wilson. Artist Mitch Clem, who had previously done work for the band, publicly broke ties as well. Steinhardt later apologized for the open letter, stating "I remain personally appalled by Joe Queer's defense of Darren Wilson, his use of the term Obongo regarding the president...at the same time, I recognize that a better way to go about this would be more thoughtful discussion directly with the people involved." Joe Queer later called Steinhardt a 'gutless wimp' and challenged him to a face to face debate to be filmed and put online. Steinhardt has yet to respond.

In an interview with Noisey, after their February 2016 show was cancelled due to a call for a petition to boycott the show from a local collective, Babely Shades, Joe Queer voiced his opinion when asked if he "supports racist, misogynistic or homophobic values?" he replied "Of course not. What normal minded person does? My closest pals here in Atlanta are Chris and Chester, two gay black guys. I was actually working a part time job. I was one of two white people on the whole job. If I was so racist, I wouldn't have worked there or be living in Atlanta! The whole city is predominantly black." He also voiced his opinion of the activist group Black Lives Matter, stating 
"Black Lives Matter doesn't care about black people, they just want to cause trouble and hate white people. If they truly cared they'd be in the ghettos of America trying to help there instead of screaming about white America. That's where the murders of black people are happening, but according to BLM it's all white cops who are doing it! It's insane thinking and not getting to the root of the problem at all. All lives matter."

In a 2017 interview, Joe Queer stated "I get called a Nazi and racist because of our name, and then because I had an opinion about the Ferguson thing,” he says. “I'm liberal as hell, and I was taken aback by how quickly people attacked me. To this day, I'll get snide comments. I was jumped by Nazis as a gay person, even though I'm not gay. I fought Nazis, so to be called a Nazi is lame by this alt-left." In the same interview he states that humor is a way to social change, we shouldn't take ourselves so seriously and that many people are looking for a reason to be offended, "“In the old days of punk rock, all these bands were laughing at themselves, and they got their point across through humor,” King says. “The Dead Kennedys, Black Flag, the Circle Jerks, the Dickies, the Angry Samoans, Flipper, X — they were funny, but they had a message. They were laughing at themselves. I don't think the new liberals are really offended. I think they're just looking for a reason to say they're offended. They completely take everything out of context. It's so insincere, this faux outrage."

Band members
Since its formation, the band has gone through a few line-up changes, with Joe Queer as the only constant member. The band currently consists of Joe Queer (guitar/vocals),  Cheeto Bandito (bass), and Hoglog Rehab (drums). The first line-up was Joe Queer, Tulu, Keith Hages and Wimpy Rutherford. The mid-1980s line-up was Joe Queer, JJ Rassler, Hugh O'Neill with Kevin Kecy or Evan Shore. The best known line-up is from the 1990s Lookout Records era: Joe Queer, B-Face and Hugh O'Neill. After leaving Lookout Records, B-Face and Hugh O'Neill left and Dangerous Dave joined. The Queers continue to actively tour and a new record is in the works. 
Current members
Joe King (a.k.a. Joe Queer) – guitar, lead vocals (1981–1984, 1986, 1990–present)
Alex Martin (a.k.a. Hoglog Rehab) – Drums (2011–present)
Chris May (a.k.a. El Cheeto Bandito) – Bass (2017–present)

Former part-time and fill in members
Tulu (a.k.a. Scott Gildersleeve) (bass/drums) (1981–1984) (died March 2015)
Wimpy Rutherford (a.k.a. Jack Hayes) (drums/lead vocals) (1981–1984)
Keith Hages (bass, backing vocals) (1982–1984)
Bobby Gaudreau (lead vocals) (1986)
Kevin Kecy (bass, backing vocals) (1986)
Hugh O'Neill (drums, backing vocals) (1986–1993, 1995–1998) (died January 20, 1999)
Joseph Hughes (drums) (1986–1988)
J.J. Rassler (lead guitar, backing vocals) (1987–1988)
Danny McCormack (guitar) (1987–1988) 
Evan Shore (bass, backing vocals) (1987–1988)
Greg Urbaitis (bass) (1987–1988)
Geoff Armstrong (Bass) (2018)
Magoo Piranha (bass, backing vocals) (1987–1988)
Jeebs Piranha (drums) (1987–1988)
Young Sean Rowley (guitar) (1988–1990)
B-Face (bass, backing vocals) (1990–1998)
Jay (drums) (1993)
Harlan Miller (guitar) (1993)
Dan Vapid (guitar, backing vocals) (1994, 2002, 2014 Love Songs... tour)
Danny Panic (drums) (1994)
Metal Murf Cretin (guitar) (1995)
Erick Coleman (guitar) (1995–1996)
Hunter Oswald (drums) (1995)
Kato Cretin (guitar) (1996)
Geoff Palmer (bass, backing vocals) (1998, 2006–2007)
Rick Respectable (drums, backing vocals) (1998)
Chris Cougar Concentration Camp (guitars, backing vocals) (1997–1999)
Steve Stress (drums) (1998–2000)
Dangerous Dave – bass, backing vocals (1998–2002, 2007–2015)
Isaac Lane (bass) (2001)
Phillip Hill (bass, backing vocals) (2002–2006, 2007)
Dusty Watson (drums, backing vocals) (2004, 2009)
Dave Trevino (drums) (2004–2006)
Andrew Griswold (drums) (2005)
Ben Vermin (bass) (2006, 2007)
Ryan Kwon Doe (drums) (2006)
Jeff Dewton (guitar) (2007)
Jonathon Mackey (drums) (2010)
Adam Woronoff (drums) (2007) (2009–2010)
Bear Williams (drums) (2012)
Lurch Nobody – drums, backing vocals (2000–2001, 2006–2011)
Josh Goldman (bass, backing vocals) (2013)

Discography

Studio albums
Grow Up (1990)
Love Songs for the Retarded (1993)
Rocket to Russia (1994)
Beat Off (1994)
Move Back Home (1995)
Don't Back Down (1996)
Punk Rock Confidential (1998) 
Beyond the Valley... (2000)
Pleasant Screams (2002)
Summer Hits No. 1 (2004)
Munki Brain (2007)
Back to the Basement (2010)
Punk Rock Confidential Revisited (2018)
Save the World (2020)
Reverberation (2021)
"Beyond the Valley Revisited Live at Loud & Clear Studios" (2022)

References

External links

 Queers Discography Page (also, source of previous line-ups)
 

American pop punk groups
Musical groups established in 1981
Rock music groups from New Hampshire
Asian Man Records artists
Hopeless Records artists
2010s controversies in the United States
Music controversies
Political controversies in the United States